The 1836 Rhode Island gubernatorial election was held on April 20, 1836.

Incumbent Democratic Governor John Brown Francis won re-election to a fourth term, defeating Whig nominee Tristam Burges and Constitutional Party candidate Charles Collins.

General election

Candidates
John Brown Francis, Democratic, incumbent Governor
Tristam Burges, Whig, former U.S. Representative
Charles Collins, of Middletown, Constitutional

Results

References

1836
Rhode Island
Gubernatorial